Bjarni Guðnason (born 3 September 1928) is an Icelandic former footballer who played as a striker. Between 1951 and 1953, he won four caps for the Iceland national football team. Bjarni spent his domestic career with Víkingur Reykjavík.

References

Bjarni Guðnason - umfjöllun og viðtal úr leikskrá at Vikingur.is

1928 births
Living people
Bjarni Gudnason
Bjarni Gudnason
Association football forwards
Bjarni Gudnason
Bjarni Gudnason